Kathy B. Ashe is a former Democratic member of the Georgia House of Representatives, representing the 56th district from 1991 until 2012. She served as Minority Caucus Secretary.

External links
 Kathy B. Asheofficial GA House website
Project Vote Smart - Representative Kathy B. Ashe (GA) profile
Follow the Money - Kathy Ashe
2006 2004 2002 2000 1998 1996 campaign contributions

Members of the Georgia House of Representatives
1946 births
Living people
Women state legislators in Georgia (U.S. state)
21st-century American politicians
21st-century American women politicians